Ghalib Khan (born 8 October 1964) is a Pakistani politician who served as Minister of State for States and Frontier Regions, in Abbasi cabinet from August 2017 to May 2018.He had been a member of the National Assembly of Pakistan, from June 2013 to May 2018.

Early life

He was born on 8 October 1964.

Political career
Khan ran for the seat of the National Assembly of Pakistan as an independent candidate from Constituency NA-41 (Tribal Area-VI) in the 2002 Pakistani general election, but was unsuccessful. He received 1,140 votes and lost the seat to Abdul Maalik Wazir.

He ran for the seat of National Assembly from Constituency NA-41 (Tribal Area-VI) as an independent candidate in the 2008 Pakistani general election, but was unsuccessful. He secured 7,921 votes and lost the seat to Abdul Maalik Wazir.

He was elected to the National Assembly as a candidate of Pakistan Muslim League (N) from Constituency NA-41 (Tribal Area-VI) in the 2013 Pakistani general election. He received 8,022 votes and defeated an independent candidate, Ali Wazir, by a narrow margin of 300 votes. Following the election of Shahid Khaqan Abbasi as Prime Minister of Pakistan in August 2017, he was inducted into the federal cabinet of Abbasi. He was appointed as the Minister of State for States and Frontier Regions. Upon the dissolution of the National Assembly on the expiration of its term on 31 May 2018, Khan ceased to hold the office as Minister of State for States and Frontier Regions.

References

Living people
Pakistan Muslim League (N) politicians
Pashtun people
Pakistani MNAs 2013–2018
People from Khyber Pakhtunkhwa
1964 births